Metzia is a genus of cyprinid fish that is found in eastern Asia. The genus is named in honor of the American ichthyologist Charles William Metz of Stanford University.

Species
There are currently 8 recognized species in this genus:
 Metzia alba (T. T. Nguyen, 1991)
 Metzia bounthobi Shibukawa, Phousavanh, Phongsa & Iwata, 2012 
 Metzia formosae (Ōshima, 1920)
 Metzia hautus (T. T. Nguyen, 1991)
 Metzia lineata (Pellegrin, 1907)
 Metzia longinasus X. Gan, J. H. Lan & E. Zhang, 2009
 Metzia mesembrinum (D. S. Jordan & Evermann, 1902)
 Metzia parva W. Luo, J. P. Sullivan, H. T. Zhao & Z. G. Peng, 2015

References

Cyprinid fish of Asia
Cyprinidae genera
Taxa named by David Starr Jordan